Acragas nigromaculatus is a species of jumping spider in the genus Acragas. The scientific name of this species was first published in 1922 by Mello-Leitão. These spiders are  found in Brazil.

References

External links 

nigromaculatus
Taxa named by Cândido Firmino de Mello-Leitão
Spiders of Brazil
Spiders described in 1922